Tipula bicornis is a species of large crane fly in the family Tipulidae.

References

External links

Tipulidae
Articles created by Qbugbot
Insects described in 1890